Ice V, pronounced "ice five", is a monoclinic crystalline phase of water, formed by cooling water to 253 K at 500 MPa. It has a density of 1.24 g cm3 (at 350 MPa).  

Ice V has a complicated structure, including 4-membered, 5-membered, 6-membered, and 8-membered rings and a total of 28 molecules in the unit cell. Ganymede's interior probably includes a liquid water ocean with tens to hundreds of kilometers of ice V at its base.

References 

Water ice